This is a partial list of places named for American statesman John C. Calhoun:

Cities and towns
 Calhoun, Alabama
 Calhoun, Arkansas
 Calhoun, Colorado
 Calhoun, Georgia
 Calhoun, Illinois (renamed Springfield in 1828)
 Calhoun, Kansas (ghost town)
 Calhoun, Kentucky
 Calhoun, Louisiana
 Calhoun, Missouri
Calhoun, South Carolina (renamed Clemson in 1943)
 Calhoun, Tennessee
 Calhoun City, Mississippi
 Calhoun Falls, South Carolina
 Fort Calhoun, Nebraska

Counties
 Calhoun County, Alabama
 Calhoun County, Arkansas
 Calhoun County, Florida
 Calhoun County, Georgia
 Calhoun County, Illinois
 Calhoun County, Iowa
 Calhoun County, Kansas, renamed Jackson County in 1859
 Calhoun County, Michigan
 Calhoun County, Mississippi
 Calhoun County, South Carolina
 Calhoun County, Texas
 Calhoun County, West Virginia

Streets and highways
 Calhoun Avenue, Atlanta, Georgia
 Calhoun Avenue, Calhoun, Georgia
 Calhoun Avenue, Chattanooga, Tennessee
 Calhoun Avenue, Destin, Florida
 Calhoun Avenue, Fayetteville, Tennessee
 Calhoun Avenue, Florahome, Florida
 Calhoun Avenue, Goose Creek, South Carolina
 Calhoun Avenue, Lake City, Florida
 Calhoun Avenue, Maitland, Florida
 Calhoun Avenue, Nashville, Tennessee
 Calhoun Avenue, Panama City, Florida
 Calhoun Avenue, Pensacola, Florida
 Calhoun Avenue, Woodbine, New Jersey
 Calhoun Avenue, Yazoo City, Mississippi
 Calhoun Creek Road, Liberty, Kentucky
 Calhoun Highway, Arnoldsburg, West Virginia
 Calhoun Highway, Big Bend, West Virginia
 Calhoun Highway, Big Springs, West Virginia
 Calhoun Highway, Chloe, West Virginia
 Calhoun Highway, Grantsville, West Virginia
 Calhoun Highway, Millstone, West Virginia
 Calhoun Highway, Mount Zion, West Virginia
 Calhoun Highway, Orma, West Virginia
 Calhoun Highway, Smithville, West Virginia
 Calhoun Hill Road, Abbeville, South Carolina
 Calhoun Lane, Burnside, Kentucky
 Calhoun Lane, Dobson, North Carolina
 Calhoun Lane, Goode, Virginia
 Calhoun Lane, Northport, Alabama
 Calhoun Lane, Pinehurst, North Carolina
 Calhoun Lane, Pitts, Georgia
 Calhoun Lane, Port Charlotte, Florida
 Calhoun Lane, Prestonburg, Kentucky
 Calhoun Lane, Sugar Grove, Virginia
 Calhoun Lane, Wadley, Georgia
 Calhoun Parkway, renamed Bde Maka Ska Parkway in 2019, Minneapolis, Minnesota
 Calhoun Place, Chicago, Illinois
 Calhoun Place, Noblesville, Indiana
 Calhoun Place, Sumter, South Carolina
 Calhoun Place, Tonawanda, New York
 Calhoun Road, Addison, Michigan
 Calhoun Road, Brookfield, Wisconsin
 Calhoun Road, Elizabeth, Pennsylvania
 Calhoun Road, Greenwood, South Carolina
 Calhoun Road, Houston, Texas
 Calhoun Road, Jerome, Michigan
 Calhoun Road, McKeesport, Pennsylvania
 Calhoun Road, Milan, Michigan
 Calhoun Road, Newland, North Carolina
 Calhoun Road, Rocky Mount, North Carolina
 Calhoun Road, Ostrander, Ohio
 Calhoun Road, Thurman, Ohio
 Calhoun Road, West Jefferson, North Carolina
 Calhoun Street, Johnston, South Carolina
 Calhoun Street, Alameda, California
 Calhoun Street, Anderson, South Carolina
 Calhoun Street, Baltimore, Maryland
 Calhoun Street, Bluffton, South Carolina
 Calhoun Street, Charleston, South Carolina
 Calhoun Street, Clemson, South Carolina
 Calhoun Street, Columbia, South Carolina
 Calhoun Street, Fort Wayne, Indiana
 Calhoun Street, LaBelle, Florida
 Calhoun Street, Gary, Indiana
 Calhoun Street, Greenville, South Carolina
 Calhoun Street, Lehigh Acres, Florida
 Calhoun Street, New Orleans, Louisiana
 Calhoun Street, Norway, South Carolina
 Calhoun Street, Plant City, Florida
 Calhoun Street, Portland, Oregon
 Calhoun Street, Port Townsend, Washington
 Calhoun Street, Tallahassee, Florida
 Calhoun Street, Temple, Texas
 Calhoun Street, West Liberty, Iowa
 Calhoun Street, Brimfield, Illinois
 Calhoun Street Extension, Trenton, New Jersey
 Calhoun Street Lane, Macon, Georgia
 John C. Calhoun Drive, Orangeburg, South Carolina
 John C. Calhoun Expressway, Augusta, Georgia

Lakes, parks, and squares
 Calhoun Landing, Santee-Cooper River, Santee, South Carolina
 Calhoun Monument, Charleston, South Carolina
 Calhoun Square, Savannah, Georgia
 Lake Calhoun, Knox County, Illinois
 Lake Calhoun, renamed Bde Maka Ska in 2018, Minneapolis, Minnesota 
 Calhoun Park, Lake Berlin, Wisconsin
John C. Calhoun Park in North Augusta, South Carolina where the Meriwether Monument stands

Schools and colleges
 Calhoun Academy, St. Matthews, South Carolina
 Calhoun Academy, Calhoun City, Mississippi
Calhoun Community College (formerly, John C. Calhoun State Community College), Alabama
 Calhoun Elementary School, Calhoun, Georgia
 Calhoun High School, Calhoun, Georgia
 Calhoun High School, Port Lavaca, Texas
 Calhoun Middle School, Calhoun, Georgia
 Calhoun Primary School, Calhoun, Georgia
 Calhoun County High School, St. Matthews, South Carolina
 Calhoun County Middle-High School, Edison, Georgia
 Calhoun County Middle-High School, Mount Zion, West Virginia
 John C. Calhoun Academy, Walterboro, South Carolina (later renamed Colleton Preparatory Academy in 1990)
 John C. Calhoun Elementary School, Calhoun Falls, South Carolina
 Orangeburg-Calhoun Technical College, Orangeburg, South Carolina
 Calhoun Academy of the Arts (formerly Calhoun Street Elementary School), Anderson, SC

Renamed schools and colleges 

 Calhoun College (Yale University), Connecticut was renamed Hopper College in 2017.
Calhoun Honors College, Clemson University in Clemson, South Carolina, was renamed Clemson University Honors College in 2020.

References

Lists of places named after people
Lists of places in the United States
Calhoun
List of places named for John C. Calhoun